Rolland Neale "Rollie" Greeno (July 8, 1926 – March 31, 2010) was an American college sports coach.  He served as the head football coach at Jamestown College—now known as the University of Jamestown—in Jamestown, North Dakota from 1965 to 1991, compiling a record of 154–83–2.  At Jamestown, he amassed 83 conference championships among the several sports he coached.  Greeno was inducted into the National Association of Intercollegiate Athletics National Football Coaches Hall of Fame.

Coaching career

Football
Greeno was the head football coach at Jamestown College for 27 seasons, from 1965 until 1991, compiling a record of 154–83–2.

Other sports
Greeno also coached cross country running, wrestling, and track and field.  As the wrestling coach he led Jamestown College to a 150–110–4 record and his cross country teams won 21 conference crowns.  His track teams won 28 indoor and 26 outdoor conference championships, including a streak of 21 consecutive indoor titles.  He finished his career by winning the final 22 NDCAC outdoor titles, along with the first Dakota Athletic Conference outdoor crown.

Academic impact
Greeno has been credited with sustaining Jamestown College through his efforts in the athletic program.  When he started at the program, almost one-third of the enrollment at the school was made up of athletes he brought in to the program.

Head coaching record

Football

Head coaching record

References

1926 births
2010 deaths
Jamestown Jimmies football coaches
Jamestown Jimmies wrestling coaches
College track and field coaches in the United States
People from Marshall County, South Dakota
Sportspeople from South Dakota